Villa Lanna is a Neo-Renaissance landmark building located in a residential quarter of Bubeneč in Prague 6, Czech Republic. It is a property of the Academy of Sciences of the Czech Republic and is used for representative purposes such as scientific symposia, jubilee festivals and also as a hotel.

Situation
The villa is situated in a large garden in the Bubeneč district of west part of Prague. Its grounds are along the former main road used to reach Stromovka Park.

History
Villa Lanna was projected in 1868 and built until 1872 by Czech industrial entrepreneur and world-famous art collector Adalbert (Vojtěch) Lanna Junior (1836-1909) to be a summer residence for his family. It was designed probably by Vojtěch Ignác Ullmann in an early Neo-Renaissance style inspired by Italian Palladian models of villa suburbana, designed at the same period by Gottfried Semper in Dresden. It belonges to the best examples of such villas in the Middle Europe.

Villa is decorated with frescoes painted by Viktor Barvitius and based on drawings of Josef Mánes. Viktor Barvitius is also the author of most of fresco decorations of the interior. In decoration took part also the Viennese painter Hans Makart. Four main salons were named after themes of Greek and Roman mythology, depicted on frescoes. They are: Salon of Apollon, Venus, Bacchus and Traunsee salon.

Actual building arrangement
The ground floor is composed of a foyer with a reception desk and two social halls with rich murals. The smaller social hall, originally the billiard room, with the seating capacity of 18 is optimal for holding ceremonial lunches or dinners. The larger hall, with the option of an outdoor terrace, is suitable for holding seminars, conferences, banquets, weddings  and family celebrations.

The first floor consists of a lounge with a terrace offering a view of the garden. A recently reconstructed tower with upper terrace gives a view not only of the surroundings of Villa Lanna, but also of the Prague Zoo or the Troya castle with its contiguous vineyards.

Accommodation
Guests can choose from various options of accommodation. There are 7 rooms on the 1st floor of Villa Lanna; bathrooms are shared by two rooms. In the year of 2000, the accommodation capacity was extended by 17 rooms with the addition of two separate buildings on the grounds. These rooms have private bathrooms. A barrier-free room is also available. All rooms are equipped with a satellite TV, a refrigerator, a telephone and a wi-fi or cable connection.

References

External links
  

Buildings and structures in Prague
Renaissance Revival architecture in the Czech Republic
Buildings and structures completed in 1872
1872 establishments in Austria-Hungary